Addamax was an American software company that developed Trusted operating systems based on UNIX System V and Berkeley Software Distribution (BSD) variants of UNIX.  The company was founded in 1986 in Champaign, Illinois by Dr. Peter A. Alsberg and had a sales and development office in Gaithersburg, Maryland.

Addamax filed a high-profile antitrust lawsuit in 1991 against the Open Software Foundation (OSF), alleging that OSF created a cartel that controlled the UNIX operating system and exerted monopsony price fixing and led to the company going out of business.

References

External links
Federal Trade Commission paper on Standards which references Addamax

Software companies based in Illinois
1986 establishments in Illinois
Companies established in 1986
Defunct software companies of the United States